Maria Leonora Teresa is a 2014 Filipino horror-suspense drama film directed by Wenn V. Deramas, starring Iza Calzado, Zanjoe Marudo and Jodi Sta. Maria. The film was named after the Guy and Pip's 
doll of the same name.

Plot
The film opens with the spiritual blessing of the new building of Little Magnolia School. The city mayor, one of the guests, warned the school's owner, Stanley Pardo (Dante Ponce), of the school's past incident where a student died. Stanley's wife, Faith (Iza Calzado), is in the school's restroom when a ghost of a boy appeared.

On the next day, three parents, Faith, one of the school teachers Julio (Zanjoe Marudo), and Stella (Jodi Sta. Maria) mourned the deaths of their respective daughters: Maria (Rhed Bustamante),
Leonora (JC Movido), and Teresa (Juvy Lyn Bison) after a tragic accident happened during the school's field trip. To help cope with their loss, a psychiatrist named Manolo Apacible (Cris Villanueva) offers life-sized talking dolls to look after. At first, Faith and Stella immediately refused the dolls for bearing such physical resemblance to their daughters. The similar speech patterns and voices disturb them, and cause them further grief. Julio, on the other hand, accepts the offer.

Julio starts to see the effect of his doll to him. He shares his fast recovery to Stella and Faith. Faith took Julio's advice and takes her the "Maria" doll. Stella still refused to take her doll but eventually accepts it when her cheating husband, Don (Joem Bascon), took the doll when Manolo offered it to him.

The three grieving parents start to recover with the dolls but hauntings starts to happen around them. The hauntings start with one of Faith's housemaids, Don and Stella's housemaid, Don himself, and one of Julio's students. The school's principal reprimands Julio for bringing his doll to class, scaring students and concerning their parents. Faith reveals to Stanley that she is pregnant. Stanley suggests to dispose Faith's doll. The dolls becomes more sinister when they start to kill people. It begins when Leonora kills the school principal, and Maria planting pencils to the stairs and luring Faith that could cause her to fall and miscarry her baby. Maria's plan failed when one of the housemaids, intercepts Faith and cleaned the pencils. Teresa starts a killing frenzy with Don and her mistress. She failed to kill Don and his mistress' son when authorities heard the screaming and starts entering the crime scene. Don is in critical condition and eventually dies. Maria targets the housemaid who foiled her plan and starts stabbing her, causing 27 stab wounds. The housemaid manage to take pictures before losing consciousness.

Faith and Stella blame Julio for offering the dolls and past incidents. Julio is in denial of the dolls' involvement. Faith opens up the past school incident where the three of them are involved; Julio storms off claiming he is not involved in the incident. Teresa kills her grandmother by impaling a sword from a St. Michael statue to her forehead.

Faith's other housemaid also noticed the hauntings and refers Faith to her cousin, Augusto, who is a witch doctor. Augusto diagnosed that the dolls are controlled by a person with knowledge in powerful witchcraft.  Stella and her brother start packing their things and prepare to leave but Teresa starts another killing frenzy but failed to kill Stella. Faith asks Stella to come and meet her in Augusto's place. Augusto conducts a seance and found out the name of the ghost that haunted Faith in the beginning of the film. The ghost is revealed to be Eldon Jacinto, the student who died during the past incident in the school.

It is revealed that Eldon is the son of Manolo and Manolo is the one controlling the dolls. Leonora lures Julio to Manolo's place and knocks him out. The three dolls meet and kill Stanley. Augusto suggests to battle Manolo and end his spell. When they arrive, they are shocked to see Julio tied. They were knocked out by the dolls. When they wake up, Manolo shared his plan to deliver vengeance for the death of his son.

Manolo plotted his revenge against the three parents who are involved in the death of Eldon and depriving him of justice. Eldon has an ability to see the future and one of his visions is the school incident. He shared his vision to his classmates causing panic. Julio punished Eldon for spreading the rumor by locking him to a classroom next to a science laboratory. The science laboratory was reported to have a gas leak and a janitor recklessly lights a cigarette causing an explosion. Before the explosion, Eldon warned the alive Teresa to stay away from the classroom. Teresa told this to Stella but dismisses it since Stella made a lot of favors to the school because of Teresa's failing marks. Stanley and Faith attempt to cover up the incident by bribing the police investigating the incident and attempts to silence Eldon's guardian. Manolo was abroad when his son died. Manolo tries to finish his ritual to turn the parents into dolls but Julio managed to untie himself and disrupt the ritual. Julio unties the others. Manolo recovers and orders the dolls to attack them. The three parents fight their dolls and Augusto battles Manolo. Faith and Stella successfully destroyed their dolls but Julio let Leonora escape. Manolo overpowers Augusto and impales Julio with a spear. Faith and Stella took Eldon's body and give him a proper burial and blessing. Manolo appears before the two and attempts to kill them but Julio appears and delivers a killing blow to Manolo before dying. The film ends when Stella and Faith visit Julio's grave. Faith successfully gave birth and Stella adopted Don's illegitimate son.

In the mid-credits scene, another parent is grieving from the death of her child from the field trip incident. She is approached by Julio the same way how Manolo approached them. He then presents her with a box containing the Leonora doll.

Cast

Main cast

 Jodi Sta. Maria as Stella de Castro
 Iza Calzado as Faith Pardo
 Zanjoe Marudo as Julio B. Sacdalan
 Rhed Bustamante as Maria Ann Pardo/Voice of Maria Doll
 Jonicka Cyleen Movido as Leonora Vera/Voice of Leonora Doll
 Juvy Lyn Bison as Teresa de Castro/Voice of Teresa Doll
 Marco Antonio Masa as Eldon Jacinto
 Dante Ponce as Stanley Pardo
 Joem Bascon as Don de Castro
 Cris Villanueva as Dr. Manolo Apacible
 Joey Paras as Augusto
 Maria Isabel Lopez as Linda
 Robert Bermudez as Robert
 Niña Dolino as Cherie
 Tess Antonio as Shirley
 Ruby Ruiz as Principal Gilaria Evangeline Punongbayan
 Eagle Riggs as Teacher Danilo
 Dang Cruz as Teacher Socorro
 Atak Arana as School Janitor
 Jaycee Domincel as Bus Driver
 June Macasaet as Mr. Tenorio

Supporting cast
 John Jeffrey Carlos as Co-teacher
 Paolo Rodriguez as Policeman
 Mike Lloren as Eldon's Guardian
 Daisy Cariño as School Teacher
 Giovanni Baldeserri as Mayor
 Olive Cruz as Dra.Ana Fajardo
 Eric Sison as Psychiatrist
 Evelyn Santos as Stella's maid
 Roi Calilong as Driver
 Raul Montesa as Faith's Lawyer

Reception
Reviews for the film were mixed to positive, with some critics praising the first act of the film for its atmosphere, while criticizing the final act to be too funny to be scary. Jodi Sta. Maria, Iza Calzado and Zanjoe Marudo were also praised for their performance.

See also
List of ghost films
Killer toys

References

External links

2014 films
2014 horror films
Philippine ghost films
Philippine slasher films
Philippine thriller drama films
Star Cinema films
Witchcraft in Philippine films
Films about Satanism
Films about dolls
Films directed by Wenn V. Deramas
Philippine films about revenge
Films about haunted dolls
Films about child death